The 2014 Tevlin Women's Challenger was a professional tennis tournament played on indoor hard courts. It was the 10th edition of the tournament and part of the 2014 ITF Women's Circuit, offering a total of $50,000 in prize money. It took place in Toronto, Ontario, Canada between October 27 and November 2, 2014.

Singles main-draw entrants

Seeds

1 Rankings are as of October 20, 2014

Other entrants
The following players received wildcards into the singles main draw:
 Ayan Broomfield
 Rosie Johanson
 Katherine Sebov
 Fanni Stollár

The following players received entry from the qualifying draw:
 Marie Bouzková
 Kim Grajdek
 Marina Kačar
 Alexandra Stevenson

Champions

Singles

 Gabriela Dabrowski def.  Maria Sanchez, 6–4, 2–6, 7–6(9–7)

Doubles

 Maria Sanchez /  Taylor Townsend def.  Gabriela Dabrowski /  Tatjana Maria, 7–5, 4–6, [15–13]

External links
Official website

Tevlin Women's Challenger
Tevlin Women's Challenger
Tevlin Women's Challenger
Tevlin Women's Challenger
Tevlin Women's Challenger